John Stanich ( January 18, 1925 - April 1, 2020) is an American retired basketball player.  He was an All-American college player at UCLA and represented the United States in the 1950 FIBA World Championship.

Stanich graduated from Sacramento High School and attended hometown Sacramento City College.  Stanich led the Panthers in scoring in both of his seasons there and as a sophomore in 1945–46 led the Panthers to the junior college national championship.  Following his junior college career, Stanich teamed with his younger brother George at UCLA.  As a senior in 1947–48, Stanich captained the Bruins squad and was named first team All-Conference and an honorable mention All-American by the Associated Press.

Following the close of his college career, Stanich was drafted by the New York Knicks in the 1948 BAA draft.  However, he chose to play for the Phillips Petroleum Company's Amateur Athletic Union (AAU) power Phillips 66ers.  Stanich was named an AAU All-American in 1949 and won an AAU championship in 1950.  After the season, Stanich moved to the Denver Chevrolets.

Also in 1950, Stanich was named to the United States' team for the inaugural FIBA World Championship (now called the FIBA World Cup).  The Americans lost 64–50 to host country Argentina.  Stanich finished second on the team in scoring, averaging 7.2 points per game in the tournament, and was the lone American named to the all-tournament team.

References

1925 births
2020 deaths
American men's basketball players
Basketball players from Sacramento, California
Forwards (basketball)
Guards (basketball)
Junior college men's basketball players in the United States
New York Knicks draft picks
Phillips 66ers players
Sacramento City College alumni
UCLA Bruins men's basketball players
United States men's national basketball team players
1950 FIBA World Championship players